is a Japanese cross-country skier.

At the 2011 Asian Winter Games he won a silver medal in the 4 x 10 kilometre relay event, together with Keishin Yoshida, Masaya Kimura, and Nobu Naruse, behind the Kazakhstani team.

He competed at the FIS Nordic World Ski Championships 2011 in Oslo.

References

External links
 Ski Association of Japan team member list 
 

1989 births
Living people
Japanese male cross-country skiers
Asian Games medalists in cross-country skiing
Asian Games gold medalists for Japan
Asian Games silver medalists for Japan
Asian Games bronze medalists for Japan
Medalists at the 2011 Asian Winter Games
Medalists at the 2017 Asian Winter Games
Cross-country skiers at the 2011 Asian Winter Games
Cross-country skiers at the 2017 Asian Winter Games
21st-century Japanese people